Nodal homolog is a secretory protein that in humans is encoded by the NODAL gene which is located on chromosome 10q22.1. It belongs to the transforming growth factor beta superfamily (TGF-β superfamily). Like many other members of this superfamily it is involved in cell differentiation in early embryogenesis, playing a key role in signal transfer from the primitive node, in the anterior primitive streak, to lateral plate mesoderm (LPM).

Nodal signaling is important very early in development for mesoderm and endoderm formation and subsequent organization of left-right axial structures. In addition, Nodal seems to have important functions in neural patterning, stem cell maintenance and many other developmental processes, including left/right handedness.

Signaling 

Nodal can bind type I and type II serine/threonine kinase receptors, with Cripto-1 acting as its co-receptor. Signaling through SMAD 2/3 and subsequent translocation of SMAD 4 to the nucleus promotes the expression of genes involved in proliferation and differentiation. Nodal also further activates its own expression via a positive feedback loop. It is tightly regulated by inhibitors Lefty A, Lefty B, Cerberus, and Tomoregulin-1, which can interfere with Nodal receptor binding.

Species specific Nodal ligands 

Nodal is a widely distributed cytokine. The presence of Nodal is not limited to vertebrates, it is also known to be conserved in other deuterostomes (cephalochordates, tunicates and echinoderms) and protostomes such as snails, but neither the nematode C. elegans (another protosome) nor the fruit fly Drosophila (an arthropod) have a copy of nodal. Although mouse and human only have one nodal gene, the zebrafish contain three nodal paralogs: squint , cyclops and southpaw, and the frog five (xnr1,2,3,5 and 6). Even though the zebrafish Nodal homologs are very similar, they have specialized to perform different roles; for instance, Squint and Cyclops are important for mesoendoderm formation, whereas the Southpaw has a major role in asymmetric heart morphogenesis and visceral left-right asymmetry. Another example of protein speciation is the case of the frog where Xnr1 and Xnr2 regulate movements in gastrulation in contrast to Xnr5 and Xnr6 that are involved in mesoderm induction. In mouse, Nodal has been implicated in left-right asymmetry, neural pattering and mesoderm induction (see nodal signaling).

Functions 

Nodal signaling regulates mesoderm formation in a species-specific manner. Thus, in Xenopus, Xnr controls dorso-ventral mesoderm formation along the marginal zone. In zebrafish, Squint  and Cyclops are responsible for animal-vegetal mesoderm formation. In chicken and mouse, Vg1 and Nodal respectively promote primitive streak formation in the epiblast. In chick development, Nodal is expressed in Koller's sickle.  Studies have shown that a nodal knockout in mouse causes the absence of the primitive streak and failure in the formation of mesoderm, leading to developmental arrest just after gastrulation.

Compared to mesoderm specification, endoderm specification requires a higher expression of Nodal. Here, Nodal stimulates mixer homeoproteins, which can interact with SMADs in order to up-regulate endoderm specific genes and repress mesoderm specific genes.

Left-right asymmetry (LR asymmetry) of visceral organs in vertebrates is also established through nodal signaling. Whereas Nodal is initially symmetrically expressed in the embryo, after gastrulation, Nodal becomes asymmetrically restricted to the left side of the organism. It is highly conserved among deuterostomes. An ortholog of Nodal was found in snails and was shown to be involved in left-right asymmetry as well in 2008.

In order to enable anterior neural tissue development, Nodal signaling needs to be repressed after inducing mesendoderm and LR asymmetry.

Recent research on mouse and human embryonic stem cells (hESCs) indicates that Nodal seems to be involved in the maintenance of stem cell self-renewal and pluripotent potentials. Thus, overexpression of Nodal in hESCs lead to the repression of cell differentiation. On the contrary, inhibition of Nodal and Activin signaling enabled the differentiation of hESCs.

References

Further reading

External links
 
 Snails have nodal!

Developmental genes and proteins
TGFβ domain